The Walnut Grove Farm is a farm complex and historic district located on Knox Station Road  north of Knoxville, Illinois. George A. Charles, the son of one of Knoxville's founders, established the farm in 1835. Charles, his sons A.G. and A.P., and A.G.'s son George were all both successful farmers and prominent citizens of Knoxville. The present farm complex includes a main house, a tenant farmer's house, a bank barn that was once among the largest in the state, three additional barns, a hog farrowing building, and a collection of outbuildings.

The farm was added to the National Register of Historic Places on August 24, 1989.

References

Farms on the National Register of Historic Places in Illinois
Second Empire architecture in Illinois
National Register of Historic Places in Knox County, Illinois
Historic districts on the National Register of Historic Places in Illinois